Birkdale Village is an urban mixed-use community in Huntersville, North Carolina, United States,  north of Charlotte, North Carolina. It was named after the English village of Birkdale, near Liverpool. It has numerous restaurants and stores. Apartments are located at the property provided by Haven at Birkdale Village. A gym, a movie theater, a supermarket, a golf course, a greenway, an express bus park and ride, and the  Lake Norman are all within walking distance for the residents of Birkdale Village.

Design & development
Birkdale Village is an  urbanist residential, retail and office mixed-use community located in Huntersville, North Carolina.

References

External links
 Birkdale Village Official Site
 Haven at Birkdale Village apartments

Neighborhoods in North Carolina
New Urbanism communities